Bedinger is a surname. Notable people with the surname include:

George M. Bedinger (1756–1843), American politician, uncle of Henry
Henry Bedinger (1812–1858), American politician, lawyer, and diplomat

See also
Morgan-Bedinger-Dandridge House